Hibbertia pedunculata, commonly known as stalked guinea-flower, is a species of flowering plant in the family Dilleniaceae and is endemic to New South Wales. It is a diffuse, prostrate or erect shrub with linear leaves and yellow flowers borne on a relatively long peduncle, the flowers with fifteen to twenty stamens arranged around two hairy carpels.

Description
The leaves are hairy and the edges turn downwards.

Taxonomy
Hibbertia pedunculata was first formally described in 1817 by Augustin Pyramus de Candolle in his Regni Vegetabilis Systema Naturale from an unpublished description by Robert Brown. The specific epithet (pedunculata) means "pedunculate".

Distribution and habitat
Stalked guinea-flower is widespread in eastern New South Wales where it grows in open forest. Records from Victoria are now referrable to other species.

Use in horticulture
This hibbertia is frequently grown in gardens and is hardy in a range of situations. It is easily grown from cuttings or possibly by layering.

References

pedunculata
Flora of New South Wales
Plants described in 1817
Taxa named by Augustin Pyramus de Candolle